The suffix ology is commonly used in the English language to denote a field of study. The ology ending is a combination of the letter o plus  logy in which the letter o is used as an interconsonantal letter which, for phonological reasons, precedes the morpheme suffix logy.

English names for fields of study are usually created by taking a root (the subject of the study) and appending the suffix logy to it with the interconsonantal o placed in between (with an exception explained below). For example,  the word dermatology comes from the root dermato plus logy. Sometimes, an excrescence, the addition of a consonant, must be added to avoid poor construction of words.

There are additional uses for the suffix such as to describe a subject rather than the study of it (e.g. technology). The suffix is often humorously appended to other English words to create nonce words. For example, stupidology would refer to the study of stupidity; beerology would refer to the study of beer.

Not all scientific studies are suffixed with ology. When the root word ends with the letter "L" or a vowel, exceptions occur. For example, the study of mammals would take the root word mammal and append ology to it resulting in mammalology but because of its final letter being an "L", it instead creates mammalogy. There are exceptions for this exception too. For example, the word angelology with the root word angel, ends in an "L" but is not spelt angelogy as according to the "L" rule.

The terminal -logy is used to denote a discipline. These terms often utilize the suffix -logist or -ologist to describe one who studies the topic. In this case, the suffix ology would be replaced with ologist. For example, one who studies biology is called a biologist.

This list of words contains all words that end in ology. It includes words that denote a field of study and those that do not, as well as common misspelled words which do not end in ology but are often written as such.

A

B

C

D

E

F

G

H

I

J

K

L

M

N

O

P

Q

R

S

T

U

V

W

X

Z

See also
 Index of branches of science
 -logy
 -ology

Notes

References

External links

Lists of English words